"I Fell in Love with the Devil" is a song by Canadian singer-songwriter Avril Lavigne and is the third track from her sixth studio album, Head Above Water. It was written by Lavigne and produced by Lavigne and Chris Baseford. The song is about a toxic relationship she maintained while suffering from Lyme disease. It was released as the fourth and final single from the album on June 28, 2019. It received controversy and backlash from Christian fans due to its image of the promotional art, and the lyrics of the song.

Background and release
On February 7, Avril wrote about the song: "Sometimes your heart conflicts with your head and leads you into situations that you know aren’t right and then once you're there, it's very difficult to get out. I also produced this song with Chris Baseford." "I Fell in Love with the Devil" is about being in a toxic relationship and was announced as the fourth single and officially the second single from the album on June 7, 2019.

Critical reception
In a review of Head Above Water, Arielle Gordon of Pitchfork said "Unfortunately, many of the statements she makes are, by contrast, stale and uninspired. Even in its strongest moments, there is nothing revelatory in the lyrics, which have a tendency to run out of steam. The worst offender might be 'I Fell in Love with the Devil', which recounts the story of a wayward lover with metaphors that seem plucked from a LiveJournal entry". Spins Zoe Camp was also unfavorable in her review, stating that Lavigne took a "technically slack (read: bored-sounding) stab at soul on 'I Fell in Love with the Devil'" and offered a "not-hot take on an abusive relationship". Alexandra Pollard of The Independent was more positive in her review of the song, claiming "Lavigne's voice reaches new heights too–particularly on 'I Fell in Love with the Devil', an ominous, tightly crafted rumination on toxic relationships". Rolling Stones Emily Zemler labelled it an "emotive anthem" and a "heartbreak-tinged number", and went on to claim that "['I Fell in Love with the Devil'] is a much more emotionally-driven track than her previous singles, 'Head Above Water' and 'Dumb Blonde'".

Commercial performance
"I Fell In Love with the Devil" did not debut on the charts anywhere, the song was certified Gold in Brazil with 20,000 units sold.

Music video

A music video for the song was directed by Elliott Lester, who previously directed "Head Above Water", and it premiered on July 15, 2019. Lavigne has been sharing teaser photos of the video shoot to promote the song which later caused the accusations of her being anti-religious by using religious images to promote the song. Some scenes were shot at the Golden Oak Ranch in Newhall, California. The video version of the song features elements from both the album version and radio edit while a portion of the bridge was inserted at the beginning. It features Lavigne driving a hearse transporting her own coffin. Later, she is seen in a dark forest wearing goth-inspired ensemble, clutching a silver cross and interspersed with scenes of her playing a piano adorned with branches. Zane Carney, who played the baritone guitar in the song in addition to doing guitar work on "Birdy as well co-writing and playing guitar on "Crush", makes an appearance as Lavigne's love interest Lucifer.

Live performances
Lavigne performed the song on The Late Late Show with James Corden on April 30, 2019.
Avril Lavigne performed the song on her Head Above Water Tour.

Controversy
After Avril Lavigne posted a promo art for the single, of her in the woods wearing black and holding a crucifix,  Several people have posted angry comments to Avril Lavigne on Instagram after perceiving the song to be an anti-religious. A former fan since her debut wrote the new single is a turnoff and told Lavigne to “get her soul right with Jesus.” One user wrote the Devil isn’t someone to be playing with, but Lavigne could do whatever she wants. Another fan unfollowed Lavigne and asked, “how can you fall in love with the Devil when God created you with [the] amazing talent which made so famous?” While Lavigne posted  explained that the song – which she penned herself – is a depiction of toxic relationships. “I wrote ‘I Fell in Love with the Devil’ as a constant reminder to myself that some of the darkest people in this world can be disguised as angels,” she wrote in an Instagram post. “Please allow my song to be your reminder to not let someone else’s demons take you down. I am now going to break this fucking cycle, bury all the toxic relationships and things people have done to me in the past, present and future.”

Track listing
Digital download
 "I Fell in Love with the Devil" (radio edit) – 3:38

Credits and personnel
 Avril Lavigne – lead vocals, writer, producer
 Chris Baseford – producer
 Stephan Moccio – piano
 Zane Carney – baritone guitar

Charts

Certifications

Release history

See also
Avril Lavigne discography
List of songs performed by Avril Lavigne

References

2019 singles
2019 songs
Avril Lavigne songs
Music videos directed by Elliott Lester
Songs written by Avril Lavigne
Soul songs